Edward Penfield (June 2, 1866 – February 8, 1925) was an American illustrator in the era known as the "Golden Age of American Illustration" and he is considered the father of the American poster.  His work has been included in almost every major book on American Illustration or the history of the poster.  He is also a major figure in the evolution of graphic design.

Youth and training
He was born June 2, 1866 in Brooklyn, New York to Ellen Lock Moore and Josiah B. Penfield. He first studied at New York's Art Students League. He worked under George de Forest Brush, who was known for his romantic scenes of American Indian life. He first worked for Harper's Weekly and later became art director.  He developed his own unique style of simplified figures with bold outlines in settings free of extraneous detail. He believed, "A design that needs study is not a poster, no matter how well executed." He wrote and published a book titled Holland Sketches, which was published by Scribner's in 1907.

Penfield lived in New Rochelle, New York, a popular art colony among actors, writers and artists of the period. The community was most well known for its unprecedented number of prominent American illustrators. He was one of the founding members of the New Rochelle Art Association which was organized in 1912.

Poster designs
His posters were bold and stood out from a distance with great clarity.  As artists like Alphonse Mucha, Théophile Steinlen and Toulouse-Lautrec popularized the poster in Europe, Penfield accomplished the same feat in the United States. For his posters, Penfield utilized simple shapes and a limited palette of colors that lent themselves to the primitive methods of reproduction of the era.

Gallery

Notes

References
Walt Reed, America's Great Illustrators, Abbeville Press, 1979, p. 114
Edward Penfield, Holland Sketches, Charles Scribner's Sons, 1907

External links

 
 
UNCG American Publishers' Trade Bindings: Edward Penfield

 

1866 births
1925 deaths
American illustrators
Artists from New Rochelle, New York
American poster artists
19th-century American painters
American male painters
20th-century American painters
19th-century American male artists
20th-century American male artists